Meeker Peak is an  mountain summit located in Lincoln County, Nevada, United States.

Description
Meeker Peak is the third-highest summit in the Worthington Mountains which are a subset of the Great Basin Ranges. This remote peak is set in the Basin and Range National Monument on land managed by the Bureau of Land Management. This landform's toponym has been officially adopted by the U.S. Board on Geographic Names.

Climate
Meeker Peak is set in the Great Basin Desert which has hot summers and cold winters. The desert is an example of a cold desert climate as the desert's elevation makes temperatures cooler than lower elevation deserts. Due to the high elevation and aridity, temperatures drop sharply after sunset. Summer nights are comfortably cool. Winter highs are generally above freezing, and winter nights are bitterly cold, with temperatures often dropping well below freezing.

Gallery

See also
 
 Great Basin

References

External links
 Weather forecast: Meeker Peak
 Basin and Range National Monument: Bureau of Land Management

Mountains of Lincoln County, Nevada
Mountains of Nevada
North American 2000 m summits
Mountains of the Great Basin